Liller 1 is a globular cluster in the constellation Scorpius, discovered by the American astronomer William Liller in 1977. It is close to the centre of the Milky Way in its galactic bulge, only 2,600 light-years (800 pc) from the centre. Liller 1 is just under 30,000 light years from Earth.

Properties
Liller 1 is located within the galactic bulge, and is heavily obscured by dust, being close to the galactic plane. Thus, studies of this object have mostly been conducted in wavelengths other than the optical range. The absorbing clouds of dust are not uniform, and the extinction coefficient RV is 2.5, less than the typically assumed value of 3.1.

Liller 1 has a mass of around 2.3 million solar masses; this makes it one of the more massive globular clusters, along with others such as ω Centauri and Terzan 5. After Terzan 5, it has the highest rate of stellar collisions of any Milky Way globular cluster. It also has the highest level of emission of gamma rays of any globular cluster. This may be due to a large number of stellar collisions and pulsars, but it may also be an unrelated background gamma ray source.

Liller 1 and Terzan 5 are remarkably similar. Although globular clusters are typically metal-poor, both have a relatively high metallicity; the abundance of metals for Liller 1 is estimated to be half that of the Sun. In 2021, Liller 1 was found to have two different stellar populations. One is about 12 billion years, but the other is relatively young, at 1 to 3 billion years. This suggests that it may not be a true globular cluster, but a class of star cluster that coalesced to form galactic bulges.

The globular cluster contains the rapid burster called MXB 1730-335.

References

Globular clusters
Scorpius (constellation)